Pediacus andrewsi is a species of flat bark beetle in the family Cucujidae. It is found in North America.

References

Further reading

 
 
 

Cucujidae
Articles created by Qbugbot
Beetles described in 2004